This is a list of now defunct airlines of Iceland.

See also

 List of airlines of Iceland
 List of airports in Iceland

References

Iceland
Airlines
Airlines, defunct